Joseph Viateur "Léo" Dandurand (July 9, 1889 – June 26, 1964), was a sportsman and businessman. He was the owner and coach of the Montreal Canadiens ice hockey team in the National Hockey League (NHL). He also was an owner of race tracks and of the Montreal Alouettes football team in the league that evolved into the Canadian Football League.

Personal life
Dandurand was born in Bourbonnais, Illinois with most of his family either migrating or born there:

 Great grandfather Christome Marcel Dandurand (1784–1865) was born in Baie-Saint-Paul, Quebec and died in Bourbonnais in 1865.
 Grandfather Luc Dandurand was born in La Prairie, Quebec in 1827, and died in 1903 in Kankakee, Illinois.
 Father Francois Xavier Dandurand (1859–1896) lived in Illinois his entire life.

He moved to Canada when he was 16 years old and attended St. Mary's College where he was an athlete in baseball, hockey and lacrosse. After graduating, he became involved in real estate and later in wholesale tobacco in the Montreal area. His first sports investment was the Kempton Park racetrack in Laprairie. After his retirement from professional sports, he owned a successful restaurant in downtown Montreal. He died of a heart attack on June 26, 1964 at the age of 74. He was entombed at the Notre Dame des Neiges Cemetery in Montreal.

Ice hockey and the Montreal Canadiens
He was a referee in the National Hockey Association and was involved with the St. Jacques minor hockey team in the Montreal area. He was a representative at the founding of the Canadian Amateur Hockey Association in 1914. He is considered the inventor of the rule in ice hockey limiting the number of concurrent penalties to two.

On November 2, 1921, Dandurand and his partners, Joseph Cattarinich and Hilarion Louis Létourneau, purchased the Montreal Canadiens hockey club from the widow of George Kennedy for $11,000. Under their ownership, the Canadiens won the Stanley Cup in 1924, 1930, and 1931. Dandurand coached the team until 1926 and was the coach for the 1934–35 season. Dandurand was also the team's general manager from 1921 until 1935. Létourneau sold his stake in the club in 1930, and Dandurand and Cattarinich continued as owners until selling the team in 1935 for $165,000.

Leo Dandurand was inducted into the Hockey Hall of Fame in 1963 as a builder.

Other sports interests
Along with hockey, Dandurand and his partners were heavily involved with horse racing. In 1932, they bought Blue Bonnets Raceway in Montreal. They owned 17 tracks in Quebec, Ontario, New York, Ohio, Delaware, Illinois, Utah, and Louisiana at the time of Cattarinich's death in 1938. In 1931, he introduced the daily double exotic bet at the Connaught Park Racetrack to encourage bettors to attend the early races.

Dandurand was also a boxing and wrestling promoter in Montreal and a director of the Montreal Royals baseball team.

In 1946, Dandurand founded the Montreal Alouettes football team with Eric Cradock and Lew Hayman. In 1949 Montreal Alouettes defeated Calgary Stampeders 28-15 to win the Stanley Cup. The team played in the Interprovincial Rugby Football Union, which later became the CFL's east division. Leo Dandurand got name on the Grey Cup as the President of the Alouettes. He only 1 of 6 persons to get their names on the Grey Cup and Stanley Cup. (See Carl Voss, Lionel Conacher, Joe Miller, Norman Kwong & Wayne Gretzky). The Leo Dandurand Trophy is a CFL award presented each year to the most outstanding lineman in the East Division.

Coaching record

References

Bibliography

Notes

External links

 

1889 births
1964 deaths
American ice hockey coaches
National Hockey League executives
National Hockey League owners
Montreal Alouettes owners
Montreal Alouettes team presidents
Montreal Canadiens coaches
Montreal Canadiens executives
Hockey Hall of Fame inductees
People from Bourbonnais, Illinois
Stanley Cup champions
Burials at Notre Dame des Neiges Cemetery